Cornelian tree may refer to:
 Cornus florida
 Cornus mas